Kafr al-Tun (also spelled Kfar Eltun) is a village in northwestern Syria, administratively part of the Hama Governorate, just west of Hama. Nearby localities include al-Majdal to the northwest, Khitab to the northeast, Shihat Hama to the east, Tayzin to the southeast and al-Rabiaa to the east.. According to the Central Bureau of Statistics, Kafr al-Tun had a population of 2,655 in the 2004 census. Its inhabitants are predominantly Sunni Muslims.

References

Bibliography

 

Populated places in Hama District